Igor Vitalyevich Presnyakov (born 8 May 1960) is a Russian guitarist. He is best known for his covers of popular music songs.

Born in Moscow, Russia, Igor Presnyakov studied classical music at a nearby academy and would eventually graduate as both a guitarist and a conductor for ensembles. He relocated to the Netherlands to further his career, which has now spanned over 35 years. His unique acoustic guitar-style is influenced by various musical genres from Reggae, Rock and Roll, R&B, Country-western, Jazz and Heavy Metal.

Presnyakov has attracted significant popularity on YouTube since joining the video sharing platform in 2007; his uploads have been viewed more than 300 million times and have attracted more than 2.1 million subscribers. He is officially endorsed by both Takamine guitars and Fender Amplification.

Albums

2010 
Chunky Strings

2011 
 Acoustic Pop Ballads
 Acoustic Rock Ballads Covers

2013 
 Iggyfied

References 

Igor Presnyakov's YouTube Channel " Iggy Pres "
Igor Presnyakov's website

Living people
Dutch guitarists
Dutch male guitarists
Russian male guitarists
Soviet emigrants to the Netherlands
Musicians from Moscow
Russian guitarists
Russian YouTubers
1960 births
Music YouTubers